The Oberaargletscher, literally "Upper Aare-Glacier" is a  long glacier (2005) situated in the Bernese Alps in the canton of Berne in Switzerland. The lower end of this glacier lies almost 400 m higher than the (original) lower end of neighbouring Unteraargletscher.

Gallery

See also
List of glaciers in Switzerland
List of glaciers
Retreat of glaciers since 1850
Swiss Alps
Rhône Glacier

External links
Swiss glacier monitoring network
Ober- and Unteraargletscher in the Topografic Atlas of Switzerland from 1870–1922
Interactive repeat photo comparisons of Oberaargletscher

Glaciers of the canton of Bern
Glaciers of the Alps
Aare
GOberaar